Houston BCycle is a bicycle sharing system, owned and operated by Houston Bike Share, a non-profit organization that administers bike sharing for the City of Houston.

History 

Houston BCycle launched in May 2012 with 18 bikes at 3 stations, and has since expanded to 1300+ bikes at 150+ stations. Houston BCycle provides a quick and active transportation, alternative for getting around the city with environmental and health benefits. 

In May 2013, Houston BCycle  expanded from 3 to 25 stations and 215 bikes. This expansion was made possible through a DOE grant, which created a presence not only in Downtown, but also in the East End, Midtown, Houston, Montrose District, and the Houston Museum District–with four of the stations located at key METRORail stops. In January 2013, a partnership with BlueCross BlueShield of Texas provided Houston BCycle with further operational funding.  

In September 2013, Coca-Cola Co.'s foundation contributed funds to open up its 29th station at Clayton Homes 1919 Runnels. The program aims to expand to 1,000 bikes at 100 stations by 2020, with discussions and planning including the Texas Medical Center and local universities, as well as additional neighborhoods such as Houston Heights, Midtown, Houston and Montrose, Houston.

Memberships and Pricing 

Houston BCycle is a membership-driven bike share system. Memberships are available by month or year and are available online at houstonbcycle.com or through the BCycle mobile app. Guest riders can rent a bike any time at the BCycle station kiosk or through the BCycle mobile app. Annual members receive a BCycle RFID card to unlock BCycle bikes directly from the dock. Monthly and Annual memberships include unlimited 60-minute trips. 

Annual Membership - $79

Monthly Membership - $13

Guest rider fee on app or at kiosk - $3 per 30 minutes

Usage fees: $3 each additional 1/2 hour after first 60 minutes for Annual and Monthly Members.

See also 

Citibike, in New York City
Capital Bikeshare, in Washington, DC
Barclays Cycle Hire, in London
Nice Ride Minnesota, in Minneapolis and Saint Paul

External links 
http://houstonbcycle.com/ - Website
https://www.facebook.com/HoustonBCycle - Facebook Page
https://twitter.com/houstonbcycle - Twitter Page

References 

Community bicycle programs
Transportation in Houston
Bicycle sharing in the United States